Karel Oomen (16 December 1932 – 25 November 2022) was a Belgian wrestler. He competed in the men's Greco-Roman welterweight at the 1960 Summer Olympics.

Oomen died in Schoten on 25 November 2022, at the age of 89.

References

1932 births
2022 deaths
Belgian male sport wrestlers
Olympic wrestlers of Belgium
Wrestlers at the 1960 Summer Olympics
Sportspeople from Antwerp
20th-century Belgian people